Ice hockey in Seattle, Washington includes professional teams as early as 1915, such as the Seattle Metropolitans, the first United States-based team to win the Stanley Cup. The city has been represented by various teams in the iterations of the Western Hockey League since 1944, of which the major junior Seattle Thunderbirds are the latest. 
Presently, the city has a National Hockey League franchise, the Seattle Kraken, who began play in the 2021–22 season.

There is also a history of both professional minor-league and junior teams in nearby cities of the Puget Sound region, such as Everett and Tacoma.

Seattle Metropolitans (1915–1924)

Professional ice hockey in Seattle dates back to 1915, with the formation of the Pacific Coast Hockey Association (PCHA)'s Seattle Metropolitans.

Formation

Early PCHL teams (1928–1945)
The closure of the Seattle Ice Arena in 1924, which ended the Metropolitans' existence, necessitated the construction of a new arena. The Civic Ice Arena was completed in 1928, and with it came the return of professional hockey to Seattle after this four-year hiatus. A Seattle team entered as a founding member of each iteration of the Pacific Coast Hockey League.

Seattle Eskimos (1928–1931)

The Seattle Eskimos were a professional ice hockey team based in Seattle from 1928 to 1931. Founded by former Seattle Metropolitans manager Pete Muldoon, the team was a founding member of the first iteration of the PCHL, and played in the Civic Ice Arena.

The team wore the barberpole green, red, and white jerseys of the Metropolitans with a modified S wordmark crest.

Seattle Sea Hawks (1933–1941)

Following the demise of the first iteration of the PCHL, the Seattle Sea Hawks began as a founding member of the North West Hockey League. The team played in the NWHL during that league's three season existence

Seattle Stars (1944–1945)

The Seattle Stars, also known as Sick's Stars, were a minor professional hockey team based at Seattle's Civic Ice Arena who played during the final iteration of the PCHL's inaugural 1944–45 season. The team was owned by Emil Sick, owner of Rainier Beer and the Seattle Rainiers baseball team.

In their single season, the team was coached by Roger Jenkins, who had coached the previous season for the cross-town rival Seattle Isaacson Iron Workers. The team won 12 games, lost 14, and tied 1 for a third-place finish in the PCHL's North division, before losing to the Portland Eagles in the first round of the playoffs.

Seattle Totems (1944–1975)

Professional hockey returned to Seattle in the post-war era in the form of two new teams playing in the final iteration of the PCHL. One team (the Stars) folded after one season, leaving the other (the Ironmen) to survive and become the Seattle Totems. Known u

Failed attempts to acquire an NHL team (1974–2017)
On June 12, 1974, the NHL announced new expansion teams in Denver and Seattle that would start play in the 1976–77 season. Vince Abbey led the Seattle group. The Seattle team, which according to season ticket promotions would have kept the WHL name of Totems, never played a game. The NHL rescinded the expansion offer later in 1974 after Abbey missed deadlines to pay a deposit and a franchise fee. Abbey and Eldred Barnes filed an antitrust lawsuit against the NHL, seeking $30 million in damages. In December 1983, a judge dismissed the suit while the trial was in progress and ordered the plaintiffs to pay the Vancouver Canucks US$600,000 in damages on a counterclaim.

In June 1975, Abbey tried to purchase the Pittsburgh Penguins with the intention to move the team to Seattle when they were sold in a bankruptcy auction for US$4.4 million.

Another local group attempted to bring an NHL expansion team to Seattle in 1990, but the deal failed due to the financial terms that the NHL demanded. Then-Seattle SuperSonics owner Barry Ackerley committed to submitting an expansion application to the NHL by a September 15, 1990, deadline as part of a proposed new arena deal, provided that a group could be found willing to meet the NHL's asking price of $50 million. His son Bill, president of the Ackerley Group, worked with Bill Lear of the First National Bank of Chicago, in order to find an ownership group for the prospective franchise. The only group to step forward was led by Microsoft executive Chris Larson and former Seattle Totems player and coach Bill MacFarland. Ackerley and the Larson–MacFarland group met multiple times, but the Larson–MacFarland group determined that the expansion franchise was worth $15 million less than what the NHL was asking for.

Ackerley rescinded Seattle's bid without Larson's or MacFarland's knowledge. Larson and MacFarland told the Seattle media that the Ackerley Group cost Seattle a chance at an NHL team. Ackerley responded that Seattle lost its chance because Larson and MacFarland were unwilling to accept the NHL's expansion terms. Among the unfavorable terms were very high season ticket requirements; a 20-year arena lease with a "substantial" share of arena revenues from concessions, parking, and ad signage; priority status for postseason arena dates; and a secured US$5 million line of credit in case the league had to take over ownership of the team. The NHL, unable to come to an agreement with any owners in Seattle, instead sold two new franchises to groups in Ottawa and Tampa Bay.

Later talks about a NHL team for Seattle were derailed due to renovations to KeyArena. Prior to renovations in 1994 and 1995, the arena had an ice hockey configuration that had been used by the WHL Totems. After the renovations, which optimized the arena for the Seattle SuperSonics, the arena's scoreboard and seats were not positioned well for hockey games. This was a major factor in the major junior Seattle Thunderbirds leaving for the ShoWare Center in Kent in 2009. In 2012, League deputy commissioner Bill Daly stated that KeyArena would be "a difficult arena for hockey" due to the large number of obstructed-view seats. All NHL exhibition games held in Seattle after the renovation were instead hosted at the Tacoma Dome 30 miles south of Seattle.

Expansion and relocation proposals often came with a new arena proposal, especially after the SuperSonics relocated to Oklahoma City in 2008. Several investors considered Seattle as a locale for expansion or relocation on condition that a suitable arena could be built. In 2011, Don Levin, owner of the Chicago Wolves, had expressed interest in building a new arena in nearby Bellevue that could host an NHL team. On February 16, 2012, a plan was announced to build a new arena in Seattle's SoDo district, just south of Safeco Field. An investment group led by hedge fund manager Chris Hansen proposed the arena, seeking to host a returned SuperSonics franchise and possibly an NHL team as well.

When Greg Jamison was unable to meet a deadline to purchase the Phoenix Coyotes on January 31, 2013, speculation began that the team would be relocated to Seattle. On June 16, 2013, it was confirmed that the Phoenix Coyotes would be moving to Seattle if an arena deal between the team and the City of Glendale was not reached. Ray Bartozek and Anthony Lanza intended to purchase the franchise for US$220 million and would have begun operations in Seattle for the following season. The relocation plan ended after July 3, 2013, when the Glendale City Council voted 4–3 to keep the Phoenix Coyotes in Glendale.

A 2013 study by Nate Silver concluded that Seattle had the largest number of avid ice hockey fans of any U.S. media market that did not have an NHL team.

Seattle Kraken (2018–present)

Successful expansion bid (2018–2021)

On December 4, 2017, the Seattle City Council voted 7–1 to approve a memorandum of understanding between the city of Seattle and the Los Angeles-based Oak View Group, co-founded by Tim Leiweke, for renovations of KeyArena. Renovations for the arena began in 2018 and were completed in 2020. The arena was renamed Climate Pledge Arena after a new naming rights deal was signed with Amazon.com.  The original roof remains in place, as it is considered a landmark. The rest of the building saw a complete renovation with land being dug down and out. While the renovations were intended for acquiring an NHL franchise, acquiring a new SuperSonics basketball team was also within the design of the approval. On December 7, the NHL's board of governors agreed to consider an expansion application from Seattle, with an expansion fee set at US$650 million. The Seattle ownership group was represented by David Bonderman and Jerry Bruckheimer, who conducted a preliminary season ticket drive to gauge interest in Seattle.

On February 13, 2018, the Oak View Group filed an application with the NHL for an expansion team and paid a US$10 million application fee. At the time, the earliest a Seattle NHL expansion team could have begun playing was the 2020–21 season pending the completion of arena renovations.

On March 1, 2018, a ticket drive began to gauge interests in season ticket deposits. Oak View reported that their initial goal of 10,000 deposits was surpassed in 12 minutes, and that they received 25,000 deposits in 75 minutes. On April 11, 2018, Tod Leiweke was named CEO of Seattle's NHL expansion team. On June 18, 2018, Dave Tippett was named as a senior advisor. Another step towards an expansion team was taken on October 2, 2018, when the NHL Executive Committee unanimously agreed to recommend the expansion bid to a vote of the Board of Governors in December.

The NHL Board of Governors voted unanimously to approve Seattle's expansion team on December 4, 2018. The Seattle Kraken played their first season in 2021–22 as a member of the Pacific Division in the Western Conference, consequently shifting the Arizona Coyotes from the Pacific Division to the Central Division to balance out the four divisions at eight teams each.  In May 2019, the team launched an interactive "fan portal" where fans could propose a name and uniform colors for the team, answer poll questions, get information about ticket pricing and seating, and view a timeline of past and future key events involving the club.

On July 23, 2020, the franchise announced their team name, the Seattle Kraken, as well as their team colors, branding, and home jersey. The event was held under the banner of "Release the Kraken", a phrase popularized by the 1981 film Clash of the Titans and the 2010 remake. "Kraken" was a name that was already popular with fans prior to its official adoption. The franchise's promotional materials state that it was adopted to honor the maritime culture of Seattle, as well as in reference to the giant Pacific octopus, the largest species of octopus in the world, which can be found in the waters of the Pacific Northwest.

On April 30, 2021, the franchise paid the final installment of the $650 million expansion fee, officially making the Seattle Kraken the 32nd team of the NHL.

An expansion draft for the Kraken was held on July 21, 2021, in a similar manner to a previous expansion draft held in 2017 for the Vegas Golden Knights, who were exempt from it.

Junior hockey (1977–present)
Both play in the U.S. Division of the Western Conference of the Western Hockey League (WHL). From 1991 to 1995, the WHL also included a team from Tacoma, the Tacoma Rockets.

Seattle Thunderbirds (1977–present)

Tacoma Rockets (1991–1995)

Everett Silvertips (2003–present)

Professional minor-league teams in Tacoma (1930–2002)
The city of Tacoma has hosted three now-defunct professional minor-league hockey franchises.

Tacoma Tigers (1930–1931)

The Tacoma Tigers were Tacoma's first entry into professional hockey, and played in the Pacific Coast Hockey League for part of the 1930–31 season. The Tigers were founded in 1928 in Victoria, British Columbia as the Victoria Cubs, whose arena burnt down on November 10, 1929, following the 1928–29 season. The Cubs spent the 1929–30 season as a traveling team before being purchased by H.A. Briggs with the intention of relocation to Tacoma.

The team's stint representing Tacoma was a short one, as the team only played ten away games of their expected 35 game schedule before folding. The Tigers scored 12 goals and conceded 24 over the course of their two wins, seven loss, and one tie, two games of which were a double-header of shortened two-period games in Vancouver. The team was coached by Mickey MacKay.

Despite a deadline extension from the league, the Tigers were unable to procure funding for the planned construction of their new hockey arena in Tacoma, and thus were disbanded on January 1, 1931.

Tacoma Rockets (1946–1953)

The longest-lasting professional team to play in the city were the original Tacoma Rockets.

Tacoma Sabercats (1997–2002)

.

References

 
Ice hockey teams in Washington (state)
Sports in Kent, Washington
Western Hockey League teams
Sports in Tacoma, Washington
Sports in Everett, Washington